P46 is a regional Ukraine road (P-highway) in Sumy Oblast and Kharkiv Oblast, Ukraine, running mainly west–east and connecting Okhtyrka with Kharkiv in a more or less straight line. It begins at Highway H12 in Okhtyrka and passes through Khodunaivka, Kupjevakha, Hubarivka, Bohodukhiv, Musiyki, Krysynska, Maksymivka, Horkoho, Vilshany, Dvorichnyi Kut, Peresichne, Solonytsivka, Podvirky, and finally arrives to the Kholodnohirsk District of Kharkiv at Zalyutynska Street and Poltavskyi Shlyakh Street (Highway M01).

Main route

Main route and intersections with other highways in Ukraine.

See also

 Roads in Ukraine
 Ukraine State Highways

References

External links
 Start of P44 road in SumyEnd of P44 road in Hlukhiv

Roads in Kharkiv Oblast
Roads in Sumy Oblast